William Horace Frankhauser (March 5, 1863 – May 9, 1921) was an American politician from the U.S. state of Michigan.

Frankhauser was born in Wood County, Ohio and moved with his parents to Monroe, Michigan, in 1875. He attended the public schools, Michigan State Normal School (now Eastern Michigan University at Ypsilanti, Michigan, and Oberlin College, Oberlin, Ohio. He was a school teacher for several years, studied law and was admitted to the bar in 1891. He commenced practice in Hillsdale, Michigan and became city attorney and prosecutor of Hillsdale County, 1896-1903.

Frankhauser was elected as a Republican from Michigan's 3rd congressional district to the 67th United States Congress, and served from March 4, 1921, until his death.  He was in poor health and was unable to attend any sessions of congress. On May 9, 1921, while at a Sanitarium in Battle Creek, Michigan, Frankhauser committed suicide by cutting his throat with a razor blade.

John M. C. Smith was elected June 28, 1921, in a special election to fill the vacancy.

See also
List of United States Congress members who died in office (1900–49)

References

Sources

William H. Frankhauser at The Political Graveyard

1863 births
1921 suicides
Eastern Michigan University alumni
People from Wood County, Ohio
Suicides in Michigan
American politicians who committed suicide
Suicides by sharp instrument in the United States
Republican Party members of the United States House of Representatives from Michigan
People from Hillsdale, Michigan
People from Monroe, Michigan